Peard may refer to:

People
Frances Mary Peard (1835-1923), English novelist
George Peard (1594–1645), English politician
John Peard (b. 1945), Australian rugby league footballer (soccer player) and coach
John Whitehead Peard (1811-1880), British soldier, the son of Shuldham Peard
Shuldham Peard (1761–1832), British admiral, father of John Whitehead Peard
Susan Devlin Peard (b. 1931), also known as Sue Peard, Irish-born American badminton player who competed for Ireland and the United States

Places
Peard Bay, a bay in the Chukchi Sea in Alaska in the United States
Peard Bay DEW Line Station, an abandoned United States Air Force Distant Early Warning Line Radar station that closed in 1963